23,000 is a 2005 novel by the Russian writer Vladimir Sorokin. The story is set in a brutal Russia of the near future, where a meteor has provided a mysterious cult with a material which can make people's hearts speak. The book is the final part in Sorokin's Ice Trilogy; it was preceded by Ice from 2002 and Bro from 2004. It first appeared in an omnibus volume with the whole trilogy.

Reception
Boyd Tonkin of The Independent highlighted the book's themes of collapse, and wrote: "Yet somehow this deliberate fictional train-wreck never loses its gobsmacking audacity, or skimps on suspense."

See also
 2005 in literature
 Russian literature

References

2005 novels
21st-century Russian novels
Novels by Vladimir Sorokin
Zakharov Books books